Arasan Ganesan Polytechnic (AGP) college is a technical institute based in Sivakasi town in the southern state of Tamil Nadu in India. It is a government-aided co-educational institution founded in 1981 by Arasan A.M.S. Ganesan, a philanthropist of Sivakasi town, under the Arasan Educational Charity trust.

AGP offers technical diploma programs in Civil Engineering, Electronics and Communication Engineering, Printing Technology, Mechanical Engineering, Electrical and Electronics Engineering and Computer Engineering.

References

External links
Official website

Colleges in Tamil Nadu
Education in Virudhunagar district
Educational institutions established in 1981
1981 establishments in Tamil Nadu